Responsibility, in the context of the law, may refer to:

 Legal obligation
 A measure of mental capacity, used in deciding the extent to which a person can be held accountable for a crime; see diminished responsibility.
 Specific duties imposed upon persons to care or provide for others, such as the parents' duty to the child or the guardianship of a ward.
 A person's role in causing an event to happen. A chain of causation means an individual is responsible for an event. This is part of the law of legal liability and public liability.